Xenophora granulosa is a species of large sea snail, a marine gastropod mollusk in the family Xenophoridae, the carrier shells.

References

Xenophoridae
Gastropods described in 1983